Daudi Chewa II  was the 34th Kabaka of the Kingdom of Buganda from 1897 until 1939.

Life
He was born on 8 August 1896, at Mengo. He was the fifth son of Kabaka Danieri Basammula-Ekkere Mwanga II Mukasa, Kabaka of Buganda, between 1884 and 1888 and between 1889 and 1897. His mother was Abakyala Evalini Kulabako, of the Ngabi Clan, the fourth of his father's sixteen wives. He ascended to the throne in August 1897 following the deposition of his father by British Forces. At the time of his coronation, he was only one year old. He maintained his capital at Mengo Hill. He was educated at Kings College Budo. which was founded in 1906 alongside Daudi, by the British Commissioner and commander in chief of the then Uganda protectorate  - George Wilson CB

On 8 August 1914, he received an honorary commission as a lieutenant in the British Army, and was appointed an honorary captain on 22 September 1917. He was appointed an honorary Companion of the Order of St. Michael and St. George (CMG) in the 1918 New Year Honours, and was promoted to honorary Knight Commander (KCMG) on 16 February 1925. He was further appointed an honorary Knight Commander of the Order of the British Empire (KBE) in the 1937 Coronation Honours. He was also decorated as a Commander of the Order of the Crown of Belgium in 1918.

Issue
He is recorded to have fathered 36 children; 20 sons and 16 daughters:

A detailed list of the children of Daudi Chwa II can be found at the pages of this reference: Some of the more notable of those children are:

 Kabaka Sir Edward Frederick William David Walugembe Luwangula Mutebi Mutesa II, the 35th Kabaka of Buganda, whose mother was Lady Irene Drusilla Namaganda of the Nte (Cow) clan.  He was the first President of the Republic of Uganda
 Princess (Omumbejja) Victoria Beatrice Namikka Kamuwanda Mpologoma, whose mother was Abisaagi Nabunnya. Princess Mpologoma was born in Kampala, on 21 October 1920. She was installed as Naalinnya to her brother Sir Edward Muteesa II, at Kasubi in December 1953. She received the Order of the Shield and Spears.
 Princess (Omumbejja) Irene Drusilla Ndagire, whose mother was Rebeka Nalunkuuma. She was born at Lubaga on 31 October 1916. She was educated at Gayaza High School and at Buloba College. She served as President of the Luganda Society, from 1953 until 1963.
 Princess (Omumbejja) Alice Evelyn Zaalwango, whose mother was Miriya Nalule. She was born on 6 December 1915. She was installed as Naalinnya to her brother, Sir Edward Muteesa II, at Kasubi in November 1939. She died of shock on hearing that the British had exiled the Kabaka on 30 November 1953. She was awarded the medal of Order of the Shield and Spears.
 Princess (Omumbejja) Margaret Juliana Lwantale, whose mother was Irene Namaganda. She was born in Kampala on 13 June 1920. She was installed as Nassolo to her brother Sir Edward Muteesa II, at Kasubi.
 Prince (Omulangira) Alexander David Ssimbwa, whose mother was Erina Nambawa. He was born in Kampala on 21 March 1934. He was arrested, imprisoned and tortured by troops loyal to Obote, following his coup d'état in 1966. Prince Ssimbwa was sentenced to 64 years imprisonment for allegedly plotting Obote's assassination. Joined the liberation struggle led by Yoweri Museveni.

The final years
He died at his palace at Salaama, a suburb of Kampala, on 22 November 1939 at the age of 43 years. He was buried at Kasubi Nabulagala, the third Kabaka to be buried there.

Succession table

Photos
  Photograph of Sir Daudi Chwa II

See also
 Buganda
 Kabaka of Buganda

References

External links
 List of Kings of Buganda

1896 births
1939 deaths
Kabakas of Buganda
Honorary Knights Commander of the Order of St Michael and St George
Honorary Knights Commander of the Order of the British Empire
Commanders of the Order of the Crown (Belgium)
19th-century monarchs in Africa
Ugandan traditional rulers and monarchs